The Railpower GG20B Green Goat is a low-emissions diesel hybrid switcher locomotive built by Railpower Technologies Corp. To date, there have been more than 50 GG20B diesel-electric hybrid switchers manufactured since their first introduction in 2004.

Original Buyers

Fuel-cell testbed
BNSF Railway and Vehicle Projects converted a GG20B to an experimental testbed, for the use of hydrogen fuel cells. The new locomotive is designated HH20B. The locomotive was publicly demonstrated for the first time on June 29, 2009, at Topeka, Kansas.

The locomotive, BNSF 1205, was built initially for the Canadian Pacific Railway, but was not delivered, due to the cancellation of the order. It was sold to BNSF in 2008, and shipped to the railroad's shops at Topeka, Kansas for conversion. The diesel generator set was removed, and the fuel cell power unit was installed in its place. Hydrogen storage is in a set of tanks installed in a heavily vented enclosure on top of the locomotive's long hood, above the batteries.  To date, it is the largest land vehicle on earth to be powered exclusively by hydrogen fuel cells.

See also

 List of low emissions locomotives

References

B-B locomotives
Railpower locomotives
Railway locomotives introduced in 2004
Diesel-electric locomotives of the United States
EPA Tier 2-compliant locomotives of the United States
Standard gauge locomotives of the United States
Standard gauge locomotives of Canada